Chicheley Brook – formerly known by the alternative name Tickford Brook – is a  long river in Buckinghamshire, England, that is a tributary to the River Great Ouse. Located entirely in the City of Milton Keynes, the river rises near the village of Cranfield, flows north-west around North Crawley then turns west before Hardmead; it then follows a southerly course past Chicheley for  before resuming its westerly course and flowing into the River Great Ouse near Newport Pagnell.

Water quality 
Water quality of Chicheley Brook in 2019, according to the Environment Agency, a non-departmental public body sponsored by the UK's Department for Environment, Food and Rural Affairs:

References 

Rivers of Buckinghamshire
Tributaries of the River Great Ouse